Eve Thomas (born 9 February 2001) is a New Zealand swimmer. She competed for New Zealand in the women's 800 metre freestyle at the 2019 World Aquatics Championships. Thomas is the daughter of British swimmer Sarah Hardcastle.

At the 2022 Commonwealth Games, in Birmingham, England, Thomas placed fourth in the 800 metre freestyle behind three Australians, including Ariarne Titmus, with whom Thomas shares a coach, Dean Boxall. In the final of the 400 metre freestyle, she finished sixth in a time of 4:09.73.

References

External links
 

2001 births
Living people
New Zealand female swimmers
Place of birth missing (living people)
New Zealand female freestyle swimmers
Swimmers at the 2020 Summer Olympics
Olympic swimmers of New Zealand
Swimmers at the 2022 Commonwealth Games
Commonwealth Games competitors for New Zealand